Rand Grange is a civil parish in the Hambleton District of North Yorkshire, England. It is a very small parish, consisting of a single farmhouse and surrounding fields and woodland, less than a mile north of the town of Bedale.

The farmhouse is a Grade II listed building, dating from the early 19th century.

References

External links 

Civil parishes in North Yorkshire